Sudara Dakshina (born 19 June 1995) is a Sri Lankan cricketer. He made his List A debut for Sri Lanka Navy Sports Club in the 2017–18 Premier Limited Overs Tournament on 18 March 2018. He made his Twenty20 debut on 4 January 2020, for Sri Lanka Navy Sports Club in the 2019–20 SLC Twenty20 Tournament.

References

External links
 

1995 births
Living people
Sri Lankan cricketers
Sri Lanka Navy Sports Club cricketers
Cricketers from Colombo